Harald Lechner (born 30 July 1982) is an Austrian professional football referee. He has been a full international for FIFA since 2010.

References 

1982 births
Living people
Austrian football referees